Paul Jackson may refer to:

Arts and entertainment
 Paul Jackson (bassist) (1947–2021),  American jazz fusion bassist
 Paul Jackson Jr. (born 1959), American jazz fusion guitarist
 Paul Jackson (poker player), English professional poker player
 Paul Jackson (producer) (born 1947), British television producer
 Paul Jackson (game producer) (born 1962), British video game publisher
 Paul Jackson (artist), American watercolorist
 Paul Jackson, a playable character in the video game Call of Duty 4: Modern Warfare

Sports
 Paul Jackson (ice hockey) (born 1940), Canadian retired professional ice hockey defenceman
 Paul Jackson (Irish cricketer) (born 1959), Irish cricketer
 Paul Jackson (Australian cricketer) (born 1961), Australian cricketer for Victoria and Queensland
 Paul Jackson (rugby league) (born 1978), English rugby league player

See also
 Paul Jackson Pollock (1912-1956), American painter